Widjajachloa is a genus of flowering plants belonging to the family Poaceae.

Its native range is New Guinea.

Species:
 Widjajachloa producta (Pilg.) K.M.Wong & S.Dransf.

References

Bambusoideae
Bambusoideae genera